Montpellier Business School is a French business school (grande école) located in Montpellier. Founded in 1897 by the Chamber of Commerce and Industry of Montpellier, the Grande école is one of the oldest of the French Écoles Supérieures de Commerce.

Montpellier Business School offers several programmes: Bachelor, Master (programme Grande Ecole), 15 Masters of Science, and Executive MBA. The business school has the triple accreditation EQUIS, AACSB and AMBA.

Identity and status

Montpellier Business School, established in 1897, is one of the oldest management schools in Europe.

Founded by the Chamber of Commerce and Industry of Montpellier, Montpellier Business School was initially created to train economic managers who would help in developing activities and businesses in its region.

Montpellier Business School has received, in 2017, the qualification of Private Higher Education Institution of General Interest (EESPIG). This label issued by the French State ensures that all its resources are exclusively assigned to the public service mission of higher education.

Montpellier Business School is an association under the law of 1901 since 2013.

The Governance of the Association brings together the many Major Partners, grouped within the Advisory Board, the Chamber of Commerce and Industry of Hérault, the Chamber of Commerce and Industry of the Occitanie region, the Regional Council of Occitanie, Montpellier Méditerranée Métropole, the Alumni Association as well as representatives of universities and other higher education and research institutions and qualified personalities.

History

The ESC Montpellier was created in 1897 by the Chamber of Commerce of Montpellier (CCI Montpellier).
In 1915, MBS became the first business school to admit young women into its classes.
The school became a member of the Conférence des Grandes écoles in 1993.
The Executive MBA program was launched in 1994, and the apprenticeship for students in the Master programme was then opened in 1997.

The year 2000 saw the creation of the Bachelor of Business Administration.
The MBS Foundation for Equal Opportunities, under the aegis of the Fondation de France was created in 2007.

Afterwards, Montpellier Business School became the first higher education institution to be accredited with the Diversity Label awarded by AFNOR in 2009.
In 2010, the school obtained the EFMD – EPAS accreditation of the Master's degree.
In 2011, the school received it's AACSB accreditation, and at the same time, launches the BADGE® Executive Education programmes, accredited by the CGE.
The Executive MBA programme was accredited AMBA in 2012.

In 2013, Montpellier Business School opened a new campus in Dakar.

In 2017, Montpellier Business School received from the French State the qualification of Private Higher Education Institution of General Interest (EESPIG), which attests to the absolute non-profit making nature of its activities. Montpellier is the 1st higher education institution to obtain the Professional Gender Equality Certification.

Grande école degrees 

MBS is a grande école, a French institution of higher education that is separate from, but parallel and often connected to, the main framework of the French public university system. Grandes écoles are elite academic institutions that admit students through an extremely competitive process, and a significant proportion of their graduates occupy the highest levels of French society. Similar to Ivy League schools in the United States, Oxbridge in the UK, and C9 League in China, graduation from a grande école is considered the prerequisite credential for any top government, administrative and corporate position in France.

The degrees are accredited by the Conférence des Grandes Écoles and awarded by the Ministry of National Education (France). Higher education business degrees in France are organized into three levels thus facilitating international mobility: the Licence / Bachelor's degrees, and the Master's and Doctorat degrees. The Bachelors and the Masters are organized in semesters: 6 for the Bachelors and 4 for the Masters. Those levels of study include various "parcours" or paths based on UE (Unités d'enseignement or Modules), each worth a defined number of European credits (ECTS). A student accumulates those credits, which are generally transferable between paths. A Bachelors is awarded once 180 ECTS have been obtained (bac + 3); a Masters is awarded once 120 additional credits have been obtained (bac +5). The highly coveted PGE (Grand Ecole Program) ends with the degree of Master's in Management (MiM) In 2022, the Financial Times ranked its Masters in Management program 56th in the world.

Research

The research activities cover all traditional areas of management research. Research activities are based on the work of permanent teacher-researchers. Several Montpellier Business School's teacher-researchers are also part of the LabEx Entreprendre.

The researchers play a role in editorial activities and in the organisation of annual conferences such as the Interdisciplinary European Conference on Entrepreneurship Research (IECER) and the International Finance Conference (IFC). In November 2017, Montpellier Business School has also organised its first International Conference on Energy, Finance and the Macroeconomics Conférence Internationale sur l’Energie, la Finance et la Macroéconomie (ICEFM).

Programmes
Montpellier Business School, member of the Conférence des Grandes écoles, develops courses from Bachelor's degrees, Master's degrees to an Executive MBA.

Every year, Montpellier Business School also offers a Spring & Summer School.

Partnerships 

MBS has over 180 partner universities worldwide.

Notable alumni 
 Éric Besson (MBS 1979), French politician and businessman

See also
 Education in France

References

External links
 Official website

Business schools in France
1897 establishments in France
Organizations based in Montpellier
Grandes écoles